The 2010 Hakkâri bus bombing occurred on 16 September 2010 and resulted in nine people being killed and three others injured, including a 15-month-old baby, after an explosion on a minibus in the village of Geçitli, Hakkâri Province, Turkey. The initial death toll was eight, and later rose to ten.  The death toll in the minivan was ten, and according to the U.S. Department of State, the PKK was responsible.

Attack
The attack occurred when a remote-controlled device exploded on a minibus passing through the Turkish village of Gecitli in southeastern Hakkari, near the borders with Iraq and Iran. The bus was carrying villagers. Resul Kaya, the mayor of the nearby town of Durankaya, said that nine people died when the bus hit a landmine. Security officials said it was a remote-controlled explosive device left in the road.

See also
2005 Kuşadası minibus bombing

References

Attacks in Turkey in 2010
2010 murders in Turkey
Improvised explosive device bombings in 2010
History of Hakkâri Province
Terrorist incidents in Turkey in 2010
Terrorist incidents on buses in Asia
Mass murder in 2010
21st-century mass murder in Turkey
Improvised explosive device bombings in Asia
September 2010 events in Turkey
September 2010 crimes